Bukhara Region (Buxoro Region) (بۇحارا ۋىلايەتى) is a region of Uzbekistan located in the southwest of the country. The Kyzyl Kum desert takes up a large portion of its territory.  It borders  Turkmenistan, Navoiy Region, Qashqadaryo Region, a small part of the Xorazm Region, and the Karakalpakstan Republic. It covers an area of 40,216 km2. The population is estimated at 1,976,823 (2022), with 63% living in rural areas.

Buxoro Region is divided into 11 administrative districts and two district-level cities. The capital is Bukhara (pop. est. 284,100 as of 2021). Other major towns include Olot, Qorakoʻl (Karakul), Galaosiyo, Gazli, Gʻijduvon (pop. 40,600 end of 2005), Kogon (Kagan, pop. 62,300, 2021), Romitan, Shofirkon, and Vobkent.

The climate is a typically arid continental climate.

The old city of Bukhara is a UNESCO World Heritage Site, famous as a "living museum" and a center for international tourism. There are numerous historical and architectural monuments in and around the city and adjacent districts.

Bukhara Region has significant natural resources, especially natural gas, petroleum, graphite, bentonite, marble, sulfur, limestone, and raw materials for construction. The most developed industrial activities are oil refining, cotton ginning, textiles, and other light industry. Traditional crafts such as gold embroidery, ceramics, and engraving have been revived. Bukhara Region is the center of karakul sheep breeding and production of karakul pelts in Uzbekistan.

Administrative divisions

The Bukhara Region consists of 11 districts (listed below) and two district-level cities: Bukhara and Kogon.

There are 11 cities (Bukhara, Kogon, Olot, Galaosiyo, Vobkent, Gʻijduvon, Qorakoʻl, Qorovulbozor, Romitan, Gazli, Shofirkon) and 68 urban-type settlements in the Bukhara Region.

History
The Bukhara region has always been ethnically diverse in origin, mainly populated by Uzbeks and Tajiks. In Eastern Bukhara Tajiks constitute the majority of the population. Large numbers of Uzbeks, however, lost their native toungue, including their clan divisions, and adopted the customs of the indigenous Tajik population.

References

External links
 Official website
 

 
Regions of Uzbekistan